Castrovalva is a frazione of Anversa degli Abruzzi, a comune in the Province of L'Aquila in the Abruzzo, region of Italy. The village, which clings to the top of a steep hill,  was depicted in M.C. Escher's 1930 lithograph "Castrovalva". The first serial of the 19th season in the British science fiction television series Doctor Who is entitled Castrovalva, which was first broadcast in 1982.

See also
Hilltowns in Italy
Abruzzo
Italy
Castrovalva (Doctor Who), episode of BBC TV series Doctor Who.

Hilltowns in Abruzzo
Frazioni of the Province of L'Aquila
Anversa degli Abruzzi